Angeline Ball (born 28 June 1969) is an Irish actress who resides in London, England. She is known for her roles as Imelda Quirke in Alan Parker's The Commitments (1991) and as Tina in John Boorman's The General (1998). She has appeared in films and television series both in the UK and in the US. She is also a stage actor.

Background 
Ball, the youngest of three sisters, was born in Cabra, Dublin. As a child she trained in tap, ballet and modern dance attending the Billie Barry Stage School at the age of eight.

Career
Her breakthrough role came in 1991 when she appeared as backing singer Imelda Quirke in Alan Parker's The Commitments. In 1993, Ian La Frenais and Dick Clement wrote the short-lived TV series Over the Rainbow for her, for which she also wrote the music. In 1994 she played Vada's mother in My Girl 2 for which she sang a rendition of Charlie Chaplin's "Smile". She worked with Alan Parker again in 1996 when she sang backing vocals for the Evita soundtrack album.

In 1997 Ball starred alongside Brendan Gleeson in John Boorman's The General, where she portrayed Tina Lawless, the sister in law and mistress of real life Dublin crime boss Martin Cahill. Throughout the 2000s, Ball appeared in a number of UK TV series including Doc Martin, Shameless and Mr Selfridge. On 26 May 2008, she made her debut as Maggie Townsend on the BBC soap opera EastEnders; her final appearance was on 11 June 2008.

Personal life 
Ball has two children. She speaks fluent French and is a trained pilates and yoga instructor. She plays guitar, and released an album in 2020.

Filmography

Discography

Soundtracks

Awards and nominations

References

External links
 
 

1969 births
Living people
Irish film actresses
Irish television actresses
People from Cabra, Dublin